HS Elektra, formerly known as SS Elektra, was a Hungarian steamship launched in 1883. In 1914, she was requisitioned into the Austrian-Hungarian Army to be used as a hospital ship. She was from then on called HS Elektra

Construction
Elektra was built in Trieste for Lloyd Austro-Ungarico. She was laid down in April 1883, launched in November of the same year and completed in April 1884. She was assessed at 3,199 gross register tons with a length of 116.3m and a beam of 11.5m.

Torpedoing 
On 18 March 1916 Elektra was sailing through the Adriatic sea off Cape Planka, when the French submarine  spotted her. Ampère fired a torpedo which hit and damaged Elektra. Elektra was beached and re-entered service after repairs in September 1916.

References

1883 ships
Steamships of Austria-Hungary
Hospital ships in World War I
Ships built in Austria-Hungary
Maritime incidents in 1916
French war crimes
World War I crimes by the Third French Republic